Mrinalini may refer to:

General
 2986 Mrinalini, a minor planet
 Iti Mrinalini, a 2011 Indian drama film
 Mrinalini (novel), by the Bengali author Bankim Chandra Chattopadhyay
 Mrinalini Dutta Mahavidyapith, an educational institution in Birati, West Bengal, India

People 
Mrinalini Devi (died 1902), wife of author Rabindranath Tagore
 Mrinalini Sarabhai (1918–2016), Indian classical dancer
 Mrinalini Sharma, Indian model and actress
 Mrinalini Sinha (born 1960), academic
 Mrinalini Puranik, Indian scientist
 Mrinalini Mukherjee (1949–2015), Indian painter and artist
 Mrinalini Tyagi, Indian TV actress

See also
 Mrunalinni Patil, Indian film director and produce

Feminine given names